The 1937 NAIA men's basketball tournament was held in March at Municipal Auditorium in Kansas City, Missouri. The first annual National Association of Intercollegiate Athletics (NAIA) basketball tournament featured eight teams playing in a single-elimination format. In 1938, it would expand to its current size of 32 teams.

This tournament is unique because it was started two years prior to the NCAA men's tournament and one year before the National Invitation Tournament, and all the teams play over a series of six days instead of several weekends. The compactness of the tournament has given it the nickname "college basketball's toughest tournament".

It began when Dr. James Naismith, Emil S. Liston, Frank Cramer, and local leaders formed the National College Basketball Tournament, which was staged at Municipal Auditorium in Kansas City, Missouri. The goal of the tournament was to establish a forum for small colleges and universities to determine a national basketball champion. 

The first championship game featured Central Missouri State University defeating Morningside College (Iowa) 35–24. It is also the lowest scoring championship game in tournament history.

Awards and honors
Many of the records set by the 1937 tournament have been broken, and many of the awards were established much later:
Leading scorer est. 1963
Leading rebounder est. 1963
Chuck Taylor Most Valuable Player est. 1939
Charles Stevenson Hustle Award est. 1958
Coach of the Year est. 1954
Player of the Year est. 1994

Bracket

The third place game featured the losing teams from the national semifinals to determine 3rd and 4th places in the tournament. This game was played until 1988.

References

NAIA Men's Basketball Championship
Tournament